The Merchant Marine Act of 1916 (also known as the Alexander Act) was passed by the US Congress in 1916 to create the US Shipping Board. The bill was sponsored by Representative Joshua W. Alexander (D) of Missouri, who was Chairman of the House Merchant Marine Committee. The act signified the birth of the modern American merchant marine.

Purpose

The purpose of the US Shipping Board was to develop water transportation, operate the merchant ships owned by the government, and regulate the water carriers engaged in commerce under the flag of the United States as well as to enforce the La Follette Seamen's Act regulations and national defense. 

The Board consisted of 5 members and was empowered to 
form one or more corporations for the purchase, leasing, and operation of merchant vessels with a maximum capital of $50 million,
to acquire vessels suitable for naval auxiliaries,
to regulate commerce on the Great Lakes and the high seas, including the fixing of rates,
to cancel or modify any agreement among carriers that were found to be unfair as between carriers and exporters, or which operated to the detriment of United States commerce, and
to sanction pooling agreements among shippers which were exempted from the operations of the Sherman Act.

Passage and amendment

The dispersing of the $50 million was to be overseen by the Emergency Fleet Corporation (EFC).  Senate Democrats managed to get the bill amended prior to passage that forbade the U.S. from purchasing ships from belligerent powers, "tremendously emasculating" the act according to Secretary of the Treasury William Gibbs McAdoo.  Despite such criticism by hardliners, the act signified the birth of the modern American merchant marine.

US Shipping Board

During the war, the Board was headed by Edward N. Hurley while the EFC passed to the direction of Bethlehem Steel magnate Charles Schwab.  The bill also stipulated that the shipping lines owned and operated by the Shipping Board should go out of business 5 years after the end of the European War and that all the Board's property, except vessels designed primarily as naval auxiliaries, should be sold.  Many of the ships commissioned during the war were never fully completed, and many of the ships that were completed were either destroyed or auctioned off in the early 1920s.  As of June 18, 1984, the duties of the US Shipping Board were reduced and currently apply only to domestic offshore ocean transport.

References

1916 in American law
United States federal legislation